Serge Edongo (born May 17, 1982) he was Cameroonian professional volleyball player. He is currently retirement. His position on the field is opposite hitter and after his career as a player he trained.

Edongo has previously played for teams in Cameroon, Gabon, Tunisia, Qatar, Bahrain, Spain, France. He won personal awards as Best Player of the Year in Cameroon and Gabon, 3rd best serve Cairo Egypt.
Edongo has previously coached Girl Team Villers Cotterets VB N3 (2010/2013), N2 Reims Metropole VB (2014/2017)
He has been playing for Cameroon since 1999.

References

External links
Serge Edongo player information 

1982 births
Living people
Cameroonian men's volleyball players